Miel de Botton is a Swiss singer-songwriter, art collector, clinical psychologist and philanthropist. She is the daughter of Gilbert de Botton and granddaughter of Yolande Harmer. Her brother is Alain de Botton.

Early life 
Born in Switzerland, Miel grew up in Zurich and studied law at Oxford University. She subsequently qualified in clinical psychology, later practicing in Paris with a focus on the treatment of drug addiction.

Musical career 
After relocating to London from Paris, Miel began to write and perform her own music, in collaboration with producer Andy Wright. She has released two albums, Magnetic (2015)  and Surrender to the Feeling (2019), and also performed at numerous festivals as well as touring nationally with artists including Wet Wet Wet and Rhydian Roberts

Philanthropy and charitable work 
Miel's charitable and philanthropic work has included support for the cancer charity Maggie's, the Nordoff Robbins music therapy charity, the British Red Cross, the World Wildlife Fund for Nature, and the RSPB, as well as the Jerusalem International YMCA Youth Choir.

In 2021, following nomination as a WWF Youth Ambassador, her song "I was Given Nature" was chosen for its annual Earth Hour event.
In 2015 she was awarded an honorary doctorate by the Weizmann Institute of Science in recognition of her role establishing centres for protein profiling and marine science.

Other work 
Miel produced  the documentary film Yolande – An Unsung Heroine (2010) about her grandmother Yolande Harmer, an Israeli intelligence officer operating from the mid nineteen-forties, and whose work has been recognised in helping establish the modern State of Israel.

She also produced the film Waste Land (2010), along with her former husband, Angus Aynsley, which chronicles the story of Brazilian artist Vik Muniz and his collaboration with a group of waste pickers (catadores) at the world's largest landfill site in Rio de Janeiro. The film was Oscar-nominated.

References

External links

 Miel Music – official website

Swiss expatriates in England
Swiss art collectors
Swiss philanthropists
Living people
People from Zürich
Year of birth missing (living people)
Swiss songwriters
Swiss people of Egyptian-Jewish descent
Swiss Ashkenazi Jews
Swiss Sephardi Jews